Smbat IV Bagratuni was an Armenian prince from the Bagratuni Dynasty who served first in the Byzantine army before switching, ca. 595, to the Sasanian Empire, where he had a distinguished military career and earned high honours until his death in 616/7. He was succeeded by his son, Varaztirots.

Life
Smbat was the son of Manuel Bagratuni. He is first mentioned some time in the 580s, when the Byzantine emperor Maurice (r. 582–602) requested the Armenian nobles to raise cavalry for service in his wars against the Avars. Smbat and Sahak Mamikonian led a thousand-strong unit each to Constantinople, where they were richly rewarded and sent home. Sebeos also adds that Maurice supposedly adopted Smbat at this occasion. In 589, however, Smbat led a rebellion against the Byzantines, was captured and sent to Constantinople, where he was condemned to death and was thrown to be devoured by the beasts in the Hippodrome of Constantinople. He was pardoned at the last minute by Maurice, who then banished him to some "distant islands" and later to Africa.

Smbat returned from exile some time after, and entered the service of the Sasanian shah Khosrow II, who in 595 appointed him marzban (military governor) of Hyrcania (the southern coastlands of the Caspian Sea). Smbat served in this post until 602, but was initially employed in suppressing the rebellion of Vistahm in Khorasan, before being recalled to reside at the royal court in Ctesiphon. There he received further honours, and was also appointed Lesser Minister of Finance.

In ca. 607 ("the eighteenth year of Khosrow's reign") he was sent back to Armenia with extensive powers as "Commander of the army of the lords of houses". His tenure in Armenia was short but productive: as N. Garsoian writes, "Smbat’s extraordinary powers allowed him to reaffirm the authority of the Persian crown in Persarmenia, to restore the prestige of the weakened Armenian Church by summoning a council that elected a new katholikos, Abraham I, after a vacancy of three years, and to rebuild the cathedral of the Armenian administrative capital of Duin, overriding the objections of the local Persian authorities". In the next year, Smbat received the honorific title Khosrow Shun ("the Joy or Satisfaction of Khosrow"), and about this time led a campaign on behalf of Khosrow against the Hephthalites, whom he defeated, possibly killing their king in single combat.

After that, he retired to the royal court, where he lived amidst the honours accorded to him by Khosrow until his death in 616/7. He was succeeded by his son, Varaztirots.

References

6th-century births
6th-century Byzantine people
Bagratuni dynasty
Byzantine prisoners and detainees
Byzantine rebels
Sasanian governors of Armenia
Generals of Khosrow II
6th-century Armenian people
7th-century Armenian people
Governors of the Sasanian Empire
Hyrcania
Year of death uncertain
Armenian people from the Sasanian Empire
Rulers of Gorgan